Yonda Thomas (born 1 December 1985), is a South African actor. He is best known for the roles in the films and television serials: Seriously Single, Mrs Right Guy, The Jakes Are Missing and Happiness ever after

Personal life
He was born on 1 December 1985 in Mthatha, Eastern Cape, South Africa. He was raised by a single mother.

He is married to Taz Emerans, a medical doctor .

Career
He obtained a bachelor's degree in Public Administration. After graduating, he moved to Johannesburg in 2008 to become a diplomat. However, during this period, he participated in SABC 1's acting competition 'Class Act' under the guidance of one of his friends. Later he got the opportunity to play the leading role in drama series Fallen telecast in SABC 1. His maiden acting came through the television series Wild at Heart in 2011. In the serial, he played the role 'Matthew'. In 2015, he played the role 'Detective Miles' in the film The Jakes Are Missing. In 2016, he joined the SABC 3 series Isidingo, with the role 'police officer Majola'.

In August 2020, he starred in the sex comedy film Seriously Single co-directed by Katleho Ramaphakela and Rethabile Ramaphakela. It was released on July 31, 2020 on Netflix.

Partial filmography

References

External links
 
 Yoh! How actor Yonda Thomas got 'scammed' by an Uber Eats driver

Living people
South African male film actors
South African male television actors
1985 births
People from Johannesburg